In intuitionistic mathematics, a choice sequence is a constructive formulation of a sequence. Since the Intuitionistic school of mathematics, as formulated by L. E. J. Brouwer, rejects the idea of a completed infinity, in order to use a sequence (which is, in classical mathematics, an infinite object), we must have a formulation of a finite, constructible object that can serve the same purpose as a sequence.  Thus, Brouwer formulated the choice sequence, which is given as a construction, rather than an abstract, infinite object.

Lawlike and lawless sequences
A distinction is made between lawless and lawlike sequences. A lawlike sequence is one that can be described completely—it is a completed construction, that can be fully described.  For example, the natural numbers  can be thought of as a lawlike sequence: the sequence can be fully constructively described by the unique element 0 and a successor function.  Given this formulation, we know that the th element in the sequence of natural numbers will be the number .  Similarly, a function  mapping from the natural numbers into the natural numbers effectively determines the value for any argument it takes, and thus describes a lawlike sequence.

A lawless (also, free) sequence, on the other hand, is one that is not predetermined. It is to be thought of as a procedure for generating values for the arguments 0, 1, 2, .... (the elements of the sequence ) such that:
Note that the first point above is slightly misleading, as we may specify, for example, that the values in a sequence be drawn exclusively from the set of natural numbers—we can specify, a priori, the range of the sequence.

The canonical example of a lawless sequence is the series of rolls of a die.  We specify which die to use and, optionally, specify in advance the values of the first  rolls (for ).  Further, we restrict the values of the sequence to be in the set .  This specification comprises the procedure for generating the lawless sequence in question.  At no point, then, is any particular future value of the sequence known.

Axiomatization
There are two axioms in particular that we expect to hold of choice sequences as described above.  Let  denote the relation "the sequence  begins with the initial sequence " for choice sequence  and finite segment  (more specifically,  will probably be an integer encoding a finite initial sequence).  

We expect the following, called the axiom of open data, to hold of all lawless sequences:

where  is a one-place predicate. The intuitive justification for this axiom is as follows: in intuitionistic mathematics, verification that  holds of the sequence  is given as a procedure; at any point of execution of this procedure, we will have examined only a finite initial segment of the sequence. The axiom can be generalized for any predicate taking an arbitrary number of arguments.

Another axiom is required for lawless sequences. The axiom of density, given by:

states that, for any finite prefix (encoded by) , there is some sequence  beginning with that prefix.  We require this axiom so as not to have any "holes" in the set of choice sequences.  This axiom is the reason we require that arbitrarily long finite initial sequences of lawless choice sequences can be specified in advance; without this requirement, the axiom of density is not necessarily guaranteed.

See also

Notes

References

Constructivism (mathematics)